Rodion Romanovich Raskolnikov (post-reform ) is the fictional protagonist of the 1866 novel Crime and Punishment by Fyodor Dostoyevsky. The name Raskolnikov derives from the Russian raskolnik meaning "schismatic" (traditionally referring to a member of the Old Believer movement). The name Rodion comes from Greek and indicates an inhabitant of Rhodes.

Raskolnikov is a young ex-law student living in extreme poverty in Saint Petersburg. He lives in a tiny garret which he rents, although due to a lack of funds has been avoiding payment for quite some time. He sleeps on a couch using old clothes as a pillow, and due to lack of money eats very rarely.  He is handsome and intelligent, though generally disliked by fellow students. He is devoted to his sister (Avdotya Romanovna Raskolnikova) and his mother (Pulkheria Alexandrovna Raskolnikova).

Plot 
An impoverished student with a conflicted idea of himself, Raskolnikov (Rodya as his mother calls him) decides to kill a corrupt pawnbroker, Alyona Ivanovna, with whom he has been dealing, with the idea of using the money to start his life all over, and to help those who are in need of it. It is later revealed that he also commits the murder as justification for his pride, as he wants to prove that he is "exceptional" in the way Napoleon was. He commits the murder, but is so nervous during the crime that he makes a few mistakes, and is afraid that he will be caught.

Raskolnikov finds a small purse on Alyona Ivanovna's body, which he hides under a rock without checking its contents. After he confesses to the destitute, pious prostitute Sofya Semyonovna Marmeladova, she guides him towards admitting to the crime, and he confesses to the police. Raskolnikov is sentenced to exile in Siberia, accompanied by Sofya Semyonovna, where he experiences a mental and spiritual rebirth.

Cinema and television
In film, Raskolnikov was portrayed for the first time by Gregori Chmara in the silent adaptation Raskolnikov, directed by Robert Wiene  (1923). He was portrayed by Peter Lorre  in Josef von Sternberg's Hollywood film version (1935), by John Hurt in a 1979 BBC mini-series adaptation, by Patrick Dempsey in a 1998 television movie, and by  Georgy Taratorkin (1969), John Simm (2002), Crispin Glover (2002). The character of Michel in Robert Bresson's Pickpocket (1959) is based on Raskolnikov. Paul Schrader, who wrote Taxi Driver (1976), was in turn inspired by Bresson's Michel character to create Travis Bickle, Robert De Niro's antihero. Woody Allen's 2005 British psychological thriller Match Point is partly intended as a debate with Crime and Punishment: protagonist Chris Wilton (Jonathan Rhys Meyers) is seen early on reading the book and identifying with Raskolnikov.

References

Crime and Punishment
Fictional murderers
Fictional nihilists
Fictional people from the 19th-century 
Fyodor Dostoyevsky characters
Fictional Russian people in literature
Literary characters introduced in 1866
Male characters in literature